Mirza Mohammad Afzal Beg (1908–1982) was a Kashmiri politician belonging to the Jammu & Kashmir National Conference. He served as a minister in the pre-independence period in the princely state of Jammu and Kashmir, and as the revenue minister in the post-independence government headed by Sheikh Abdullah. In this post he led the land reforms in Jammu and Kashmir, recognised as the most successful land reforms in India.

After the dismissal of Sheikh Abdullah government in 1953, Beg was incarcerated along with Abdullah and charged in the Kashmir Conspiracy Case. Beg founded a new party called the Plebiscite Front, demanding that Kashmir's accession to India should be decided by a plebiscite. In 1974, he paved the way for Abdullah's rehabilitation by negotiating with the Indian government, leading to the 1974 Indira-Sheikh accord. 

Plebiscite Front was then transformed into the present day National Conference.

Beg served as the Deputy Chief Minister in the next government headed by Sheikh Abdullah. In 1978, Abdullah expelled him from the National Conference, alleging that he was causing defections.

Early life 
Afzal Beg hailed from Anantnag and was the son of Mirza Nizamudin Beg, brother of Mirza Ghulam Qadir Beg and nephew of the landlord, Mirza Ghulam Mohammad Beg, of Anantnag. He graduated from Sri Pratap College, Sri Nagar and studied law at Aligarh Muslim University.

Career

Princely state 
Beg joined Sheikh Abdullah's Muslim Conference from its inception. In 1934 elections, he was elected to the Praja Sabha and served as the deputy leader of the parliamentary party. In 1937–38, after Gopalaswami Ayyangar became the prime minister of the state, Afzal Beg and Girdhari Lal Dogra were appointed cabinet ministers.

Soon after the 1938 election, Sheikh Abdullah, along with other members, launched an initiative to transform the Muslim Conference into an inclusive nationalist party, to be called the National Conference. The Muslim nationalist members, including Choudhry Ghulam Abbas, opposed the move. Afzal Beg is said to have counselled caution, fearing a vertical division of the party. Despite the apprehensions, the special session of the party convened in June 1939, overwhelmingly passed a resolution transforming itself into National Conference.

In 1944, Beg was appointed a cabinet minister again and given the charge of Public Works and Municipalities. In March 1946, after Pandit Ram Chandra Kak was appointed the prime minister, the National Conference pulled out of the government and launched its Quit Kashmir movement. Beg stepped down from his ministerial post for this development. He was arrested for taking part in the movement.

Indian state 

He was part of the Constituent Assembly of India and Jammu and Kashmir.

Plebiscite Front

Return to government 

In 1978, Beg was expelled from the National Conference party by Sheikh Abdullah, on allegations of causing party defections. Abdullah then groomed his own son Farooq Abdullah as his successor.

Death 
Mirza Afzal Beg died on 11 June 1982. He is survived by three sons and three daughters. His son Mirza Mehboob Beg is also a politician in the state.

Notes

References

Bibliography 
 
 
 

Kashmiri people
Deputy chief ministers of Jammu and Kashmir
1982 deaths
Jammu & Kashmir National Conference politicians
People from Anantnag district
1908 births
Prisoners and detainees of India